Anthracobia is a genus of fungi in the family Pyronemataceae. The genus was circumscribed by Jean Louis Émile Boudier in 1885. Anthracobia is widely distributed in north temperate regions, and contains 15 species. Phylogenetic analyses suggest that the genus as currently circumscribed is polyphyletic.

References

Pyronemataceae
Pezizales genera
Taxa named by Jean Louis Émile Boudier
Taxa described in 1885